The Holiday Collection is the fifth compilation album by saxophonist Kenny G. It was released by Arista Records in 2006, and peaked at number 1 on the Contemporary Jazz chart, number 40 on the R&B/Hip-Hop Albums chart and number 85 on the Billboard 200.

Track listing

References

Kenny G compilation albums
2006 Christmas albums
2006 compilation albums
Christmas compilation albums
Christmas albums by American artists
Jazz Christmas albums
Arista Records Christmas albums
Arista Records compilation albums